Ubaldo Ragona (1 December 1916 in Catania – 15 August 1987 in Rome) was an Italian film director and screenwriter.

During his early life, Ragona was very interested by movies and became the director of an Italian cinematography journal "Passo Ridotto". 
At the beginning of his career he focused on documentaries, moving to feature films after a period of break.

Filmography

Director 
 Il fiume dei Faraoni (1955) - Documentary
 Baldoria nei Caraibi (1957) - Documentary
 The Last Man on Earth (with Sidney Salkow) (1964)
 Sweet Smell of Love (1966)

Screenwriter 
 Baldoria nei Caraibi (1957) - Documentary
 The Last Man on Earth (1964)
 Sweet Smell of Love (1966)

Trivia 
He is brother of cinematographer Claudio Ragona.

He used the alias Ubaldo B. Ragona in some of his movies.

External links 
 

Italian film directors
Film people from Catania
1916 births
1987 deaths